Årø is a small island in the Lillebælt in Denmark. It is due east of Haderslev and just offshore from Årøsund.

Aaro
Geography of Haderslev Municipality